"Water" is a song written by the British female singer-songwriter Lynsey de Paul and Barry Blue, who was credited as Barry Green. It was first released as a track on De Paul's debut album Surprise in March 1973. Shortly afterwards, a live version that de Paul recorded for the BBC, appearing on the BBC Transcription Services album number 443 in April 1973. It was released as a single later that year in Peru (and possibly other South American countries) with the title "Agua" but the song was not released as a single in Europe, Japan and the USA. It has since appeared on a number of de Paul compilation albums such as Greatest Hits, The Best of Lynsey de Paul and the Sugar and Beyond anthology.

"Water" has been covered by Japanese singer Nickey on her 2013 album A Taste of Honey, complete with Japanese lyrics. However, from the arrangement, this version sounds more akin to the live version that de Paul recorded for the BBC. When de Paul heard "You Don't Know" she loved how they had used her music and personally intervened directly with her record company and publishers to make sure the deal happened. De Paul and Blue also received co-writing credits on "You Don't Know". As well as being released as a CD single with various remixes, it was included as a track on the album Antique Soul and their 2019 compilation double vinyl and CD album "Solid Brass: Ten Years Of Northern Funk.

The song, with de Paul's original vocal repeating the title, was also used as a backing track for the rap "Water" by British rap artist Twiggz on his 2018 release. This version was credited to Twiggz, featuring Lynsey de Paul.

References

1973 singles
Songs written by Lynsey de Paul
1973 songs
Songs written by Barry Blue
MAM Records singles